Mindon may refer to:

 Mindon Min, king of Burma
 Mindon, Burma, a town
 Mindon, Uzbekistan, a town
 Mindon Township, whose seat is Mindon, Burma

See also
 Minden (disambiguation)